Naberezhne (Ukrainian: Набережне, Russian: Набережное), is a village in the district of Lenine Raion in Crimea.

Georgraphy 
Naberezhne is located in the south-east of the district and the Kerch Peninsula, to the south of Tobechytske Lake and northeast of Zavitne.

References 

Populated coastal places in Ukraine